The Return of Don Patterson (also released as The Genius of the B-3) is an album by organist Don Patterson recorded in 1972 and released on the Muse label.

Reception
Allmusic awarded the album 4½ stars with a review stating, "Any Don Patterson album is worthwhile".

Track listing 
All compositions by Don Patterson except as indicated
 "Jesse Jackson" - 7:20   
 "Theme from the Odd Couple" (Neal Hefti) - 8:35   
 "Lori" (Jimmy Garrison) - 7:08   
 "(Where Do I Begin) Love Story" (Francis Lai, Carl Sigman) - 9:56   
 "The Lamp Is Low" (Peter DeRose, Mitchell Parish, Maurice Ravel, Bert Shefter) - 10:11

Personnel 
Don Patterson - organ
Eddie Daniels - tenor saxophone, alto saxophone, soprano saxophone
Ted Dunbar - guitar
Freddie Waits - drums

References 

Don Patterson (organist) albums
1972 albums
Muse Records albums
Albums produced by Don Schlitten